Basin Groups refers to 9 subdivisions of the lunar Pre-Nectarian geologic period. It is the second era of the Hadean.

Definition
The motivation for creating the Basin Groups subdivisions was to place 30 pre-Nectarian impact basins into 9 relative age groups. The relative age of the first basin in each group is based on crater densities and superposition relationships, whereas the other basins are included based on weaker grounds. Basin Group 1 has no official age for its base, and the boundary between Basin Group 9 and the Nectarian period is defined by the formation of the Nectaris impact basin.

The age of the Nectaris basin is somewhat contentious, with the most frequently cited numbers placing it at 3.92 Ga, or more infrequently at 3.85 Ga. Recently, however, it has been suggested that the Nectaris basin could be, in fact, much older and might have formed at ~4.1 Ga. Basin Groups are not used as a geologic period on any of the United States Geological Survey lunar geologic maps. Basin Groups 1-9 and the earlier (informal) Cryptic era together make up the totality of the Pre-Nectarian period.

Relationship to Earth's geologic time scale
Since little or no geological evidence on Earth exists from the time spanned by the Pre-Nectarian period of the Moon, the Pre-Nectarian has been used as a guide by at least one notable scientific work to subdivide the unofficial terrestrial Hadean eon. In particular, it is sometimes found that the Hadean eon is subdivided into the Cryptic era and Basin Groups 1-9 (which collectively make up the Pre-Nectarian), and the Nectarian and Lower Imbrian. The first lifeforms (self replicating RNA molecules, see RNA world hypothesis) may have evolved on earth around 4 bya during this era.

See also

 Cryptic era
 Geological time scale (Earth)

References

External links
 GeoWhen Database

02
Lunar geologic periods